"Amazing" is a song by American hard rock band Aerosmith. Don Henley lends his vocals, shadowing lead singer Steven Tyler in parts of this song. The rock ballad was written by Tyler and longtime band friend and collaborator Richie Supa. It peaked at number 24 on the US Billboard Hot 100, number three on the Billboard Album Rock Tracks chart, number nine on the Billboard Mainstream Top 40. The song was also successful abroad, peaking at number two in Iceland, number four in Canada, number five in Norway, and the top 20 in the Netherlands and Switzerland.

On the album Get a Grip, as soon as the song ends, a radio is heard being tuned into a recording of "Who Threw the Whiskey in the Well", recorded by Lucky Millinder. Tyler says, "So from all of us at Aerosmith to all of you out there, wherever you are, remember: the light at the end of the tunnel may be you. Good night." Millinder's orchestra plays as the music fades out.

Lyrical content
It is written by Steven Tyler, with assistance from the professional songwriter and former bandmate Richie Supa. It tells about his troubled life and drug abuse after the band broke up.

The 1987 comeback album, Permanent Vacation, and its title track were mentioned in the lyrics for "Amazing".

Critical reception
Pan-European magazine Music & Media commented, "Hold your lighters into the air and do the wave, because this is the ultimate stadium rock ballad. You will still be singing it when you drive home." Leesa Daniels from Smash Hits gave "Amazing" five out of five, writing, "The 'Smith have yet again come up with another anthem rock ballad that'll have you screeching in full rock god style until your lungs explode."

Music video

The accompanying music video for the song, directed by Marty Callner, is well known for its depiction of digital technology and was the second appearance of Alicia Silverstone in the band's videos. Paired with her was Jason London, star of Dazed and Confused, a film which was released in the same year as Get a Grip and which memorably made numerous references to Aerosmith. The characters appear in the music video as two cyberspace kids who escape to a world of virtual reality together, neither realizing the other is also in virtual reality. The head-mounted display worn by London in the video was manufactured by Liquid Image, who was contacted by the production crew and asked to provide a head-mounted display system for the VR sequence. Aerosmith guitarist Joe Perry suffered a slight head injury during the making of the video, and it was extended by 52 seconds at the end, where two loops were inserted.

In the virtual dream world, the two embark on a motorcycle journey and sky-dive, as well as engage in a steamy makeout session. One part of the video shows the characters boarding and taking flight in a biplane which, combined with the digital technology, creates what is often regarded as a fascinating dichotomy between antiquated and modern technology, in some ways presenting a parallel for the characters. Meanwhile, members of the band perform in various parts throughout the song, including in a tunnel, as well as solo shots of Steven Tyler in a room by himself and Joe Perry playing a guitar solo with a cityscape in the background. At the end of the video, it is discovered that it was Silverstone who was engaging in the virtual fantasy.

Track listing

Charts

Weekly charts

Year-end charts

Release history

References

Aerosmith songs
1990s ballads
1992 songs
1993 singles
Geffen Records singles
Music videos directed by Marty Callner
Rock ballads
Song recordings produced by Bruce Fairbairn
Songs written by Richard Supa
Songs written by Steven Tyler